Leland G. Christensen (April 30, 1959 – February 4, 2022) was an American politician who was a Republican member of the Wyoming Senate, representing the 17th district from 2011 until 2019.

Life and career
Christensen was born in Alta, Wyoming, and lived in Jackson, Wyoming. He worked as a law enforcement officer and an auctioneer. He served for fifteen years in the Wyoming National Guard and with the 19th Special Forces Group in the U.S. Army.

He died from complications of COVID-19 in Idaho Falls, Idaho, on February 4, 2022, at the age of 62, during the COVID-19 pandemic in Idaho. At the time of his death, Christensen was receiving chemotherapy for non-Hodgkin lymphoma.

Electoral history

2010
After incumbent Republican Senator Grant Larson announced his retirement, Christensen - then a Teton County Commissioner - announced his candidacy. He defeated Sam Harrell in the Republican primary and defeated Democratic candidate Tom Frisbie in the general election, 52% to 48%.

2014
Christensen was re-elected to the State Senate unopposed in both the primary and general elections.

2016
Christensen ran for the U.S. House seat held by Cynthia Lummis after Lummis announced her retirement, but lost in the primary to Liz Cheney on August 16, 2016.

He ran for state treasurer but lost in the primary to Curt Meier, and did not seek reelection in the State Senate.

References

External links
Profile on Ballotpedia

1959 births
2022 deaths
21st-century American politicians
American auctioneers
Deaths from the COVID-19 pandemic in Idaho
People from Jackson, Wyoming
People from Teton County, Wyoming
Wyoming National Guard personnel
County commissioners in Wyoming
Republican Party Wyoming state senators